The 2010 Millsaps Majors football team represented Millsaps College as a member of the Southern Collegiate Athletic Conference (SCAC) during the 2010 NCAA Division III football season. On March 1, 2010, Aaron Pelch was named head coach to succeed Mike DuBose. Pelch, a former Weber State University player and 2001 graduate, was a defensive assistant for DuBose's Majors from 2006 to 2008, before joining Tom Cable's Oakland Raiders staff as a special teams coach in 2009.

The Majors' 2011 senior class tied the record set by the previous year's senior class of most career victories, with 33 in a four-year span. For the fifth year in a row, the Majors' offense was the SCAC's highest scoring unit.

Schedule

References

Millsaps
Millsaps Majors football seasons
Millsaps Majors football